Federal Ministry of Justice may refer to:

 Ministry of Justice (Austria)
 Federal Ministry of Justice (Germany)
 Federal Ministry of Justice (Nigeria)